The 2019 Houston Outlaws season was the second season of the Houston Outlaws's existence in the Overwatch League (OWL) and their second under head coach Tae-yeong Kim. After finishing 22–18 the previous season, the Outlaws were looking to improve on their record and qualify for the season playoffs for the first time.

The Outlaws began the season winning three of their matches in Stage 1. The stage was capped off by a 1–3 loss to the Atlanta Reign that prevented Houston from qualifying for the Stage 1 Playoffs. Houston performed poorly in Stage 2, as the team did not claim a single victory in their seven matches of the stage. After the All-Star break, the Outlaws hit their stride, posting a 5–2 record in Stage 3 and qualifying for the Stage 3 Playoffs. However, lost to the Vancouver Titans 0–3 in the quarterfinals. A 1–3 loss to the London Spitfire in Week 3 of Stage 4 officially eliminated the Outlaws from season playoff contention. Houston ended the season on a 5-game losing streak to finish the season with a disappointing 9–19 record.

Preceding offseason

Player re-signings 
From August 1 to September 9, 2018, all Overwatch League teams that competed in the 2018 season could choose to extend their team's players' contracts. Outlaws elected to release three of its players, Russell "FCTFCTN" Campbell, Lucas "Mendokusaii" Håkansson, and Matthew "Clockwork" Dias; Mendokusaii and Clockwork were moved to non-player roles with the team.

Free agency 
All non-expansion teams could not enter the free agency period until October 8; they were able to sign members from their respective academy team and make trades until then. On September 18, Outlaws traded GG Esports Academy player Yoo "Smurf" Myeong-hwan to San Francisco Shock in exchange for Dante "Danteh" Cruz.

Regular season 
The Outlaws opened their 2019 season with a match against the new expansion franchise Toronto Defiant on February 15; the Outlaws lost 2–3. Houston finished Stage 1 with a 3–4 record and did not qualify for the stage playoffs.

In Stage 2, the Outlaws faced their in-state rivals, the Dallas Fuel. Houston, who had never lost to Dallas, lost the match 1–3. The Outlaws ended the stage with a winless 0–7 record.

In Stage 3, Houston found themselves in an eight-game losing streak; however, a win over the San Francisco Shock snapped both Houston's losing streak and San Francisco's eleven-game winning streak. The Outlaws, who had a winless Stage 2, finished Stage 3 with a 5–2 record and secured a spot in the Stage 3 Playoffs. The Outlaws faced the second-seeded Vancouver Titans in the Stage 3 Quarterfinals on July 11; Houston was unable secure a map win and lost the match 0–3.

The Outlaws were officially eliminated from playoff contention after a loss to the London Spitfire on August 10.

Sale of the franchise 
On June 12, Immortals Gaming Club (IGC), the parent company of Immortals and Los Angeles Valiant, acquired Infinite Esports, the parent company of Houston Outlaws and OpTic Gaming, marking the first major sale of any Overwatch League franchise. By OWL rules, one company may not own more than one OWL franchise. Both Riot Games and Activision Blizzard approved the sale, but IGC must operate Valiant and Outlaws as entirely separate entities, with oversight by OWL representatives, until IGC sell the Outlaws.

Final roster

Standings

Record by stage

League

Game log

Regular season

Awards 
On May 8, Dante "Danteh" Cruz was named as a reserve for the 2019 Overwatch League All-Star Game.

References 

2019 Overwatch League seasons by team
Houston Outlaws
Houston Outlaws seasons